The 1963 VFL Night Premiership Cup was the Victorian Football League end of season cup competition played in September and October of the 1963 VFL Premiership Season. Run as a knock-out tournament, it was contested by the eight VFL teams that failed to make the 1963 VFL finals series. It was the eighth VFL Night Series competition. Games were played at the Lake Oval, Albert Park, then the home ground of South Melbourne, as it was the only ground equipped to host night games. Footscray won its first night series cup defeating Richmond in the final by 6 points.

Games

Round 1

|- bgcolor="#CCCCFF"
| Winning team
| Winning team score
| Losing team
| Losing team score
| Ground
| Crowd
| Date
|- bgcolor="#FFFFFF"
| 
| 14.13 (97)
| 
| 9.11 (65)
| Lake Oval
| 7,550
| Tuesday, 10 September
|- bgcolor="#FFFFFF"
| 
| 7.13 (55)
| 
| 6.11 (47)
| Lake Oval
| 11,100
| Friday, 13 September
|- bgcolor="#FFFFFF"
| 
| 10.15 (75)
| 
| 6.8 (44)
| Lake Oval
| 7,100
| Monday, 16 September
|- bgcolor="#FFFFFF"
| 
| 8.11 (59)
| 
| 7.11 (53)
| Lake Oval
| 15,500
| Friday, 20 September

Semi-finals

|- bgcolor="#CCCCFF"
| Winning team
| Winning team score
| Losing team
| Losing team score
| Ground
| Crowd
| Date
|- bgcolor="#FFFFFF"
| 
| 11.6 (72)
| 
| 6.10 (46)
| Lake Oval
| 17,480
| Monday, 23 September
|- bgcolor="#FFFFFF"
| 
| 11.7 (73)
| 
| 4.6 (30)
| Lake Oval
| 15,380
| Wednesday, 25 September

Final

|- bgcolor="#CCCCFF"
| Winning team
| Winning team score
| Losing team
| Losing team score
| Ground
| Crowd
| Date
|- bgcolor="#FFFFFF"
| 
| 10.9 (69)
| 
| 9.9 (63)
| Lake Oval
| 25,270
| Monday, 2 October

See also

List of Australian Football League night premiers
1963 VFL season

External links
 1963 VFL Night Premiership - detailed review including quarter-by-quarter scores, best players and goalkickers for each match

Australian Football League pre-season competition